The 1985 FIFA World Youth Championship was the fifth edition FIFA World Youth Championship, was held in the Soviet Union (USSR) from 24 August to 7 September 1985. The tournament took place in ten venues within eight host cities — Baku, Yerevan, Leningrad, Minsk (2 stadiums), Moscow, Hoktemberyan, Tbilisi (2 stadiums) and Sumqayit — where a total of 32 matches were played. U20 Brazil successfully defended its title, defeating Spain, 1–0, in the final match at Moscow's Luzhniki Stadium.

Venues 
10 different stadiums hosted the tournament in 8 host cities, divided among 5 Soviet republics: Armenian SSR (2 venues in 2 host cities), Azerbaijan SSR (2 venues in 2 host cities), Byelorussian SSR (2 venues in 1 host city), Georgian SSR (2 venues in 1 host city), and Russian SFSR (2 venues in 2 host cities).

Qualification 

1.Teams that made their debut.

Squads 

For a list of all squads that played in the final tournament, see 1985 FIFA World Youth Championship squads

Group stage

Group A

Group B

Group C

Group D

Knockout stage

Quarterfinals

Semi-finals

Third place play-off

Final

Result

Awards

Goalscorers 

Sebastián Losada of Spain won the Golden Shoe award for scoring three goals. In total, 80 goals were scored by 55 different players, with none of them credited as own goal.

3 goals

  Balalo
  Gérson da Silva
  Müller
  Alberto García Aspe
  Odiaka Monday
  Fernando Gómez Colomer
  Sebastián Losada

2 goals

  Dida
  Emil Kostadinov
  Gao Hongbo
  Gong Lei
  John Jairo Tréllez
  Attila Pintér
  Pál Fischer
  Mark Anunobi
  Oleg Kuzhlev
  Sergei Khudozhilov
  Valdas Ivanauskas

1 goal

  Cris Kalantzis
  John Panagis
  Henrique Arlindo Etges
  Luciano
  Paulo Silas
  Lyuboslav Penev
  Petar Mihtarski
  Radko Kalaydjiev
  Song Lianyong
  Felipe Pérez
  John Castaño
  Wilson Rodríguez
  Philip Priest
  Robert Wakenshaw
  János Zsinka
  Brian Mooney
  Pat Kelch
  Marcus Tuite
  Francisco Javier Cruz
  Héctor Becerra
  Ignacio Ambríz
  Víctor Medina
  Augustine Igbinabaro
  Niyi Adeleye
  Samson Siasia
  Jorge Cartaman
  Luis Jara
  Trigo Mereles
  Mohaisen Al-Jam'an
  Igor Sklyarov
  Gela Ketashvili
  Soso Chedia
  Vladimir Tatarchuk
  Ion Andoni Goikoetxea
  Marcelino
  Mohamed Abdelhak
  Sami Touati

Final ranking

Notes

External links 
 FIFA World Youth Championship USSR 1985 , FIFA.com
 RSSSF > FIFA World Youth Championship > 1985
 FIFA Technical Report (Part 1) and (Part 2)
 All Matches of the Brazilian Soccer Team

Fifa World Youth Championship, 1985
FIFA World Youth Championship
FIFA World Youth Championship
1985
August 1985 sports events in Europe
September 1985 sports events in Europe
1985 in Moscow